Ken Criter (born February 17, 1947 in Fond du Lac, Wisconsin) is an  American college and professional football player who played for the American Football League's Denver Broncos. Criter graduated from New Holstein High School in New Holstein, Wisconsin.  He went on to attend the University of Wisconsin–Madison, where he played college football.  A linebacker at Wisconsin, Criter became a first-Team All-Big Ten selection in 1967 and 1968.

Criter went on to the AFL where he played for the Denver Broncos in 1969.  The Broncos  joined the NFL in 1970 and Criter played for them until 1974.  During his first two of seasons Criter wore the jersey number 78, but later switched to jersey number 53.  He played in 75 games for the Broncos, and served as a linebacker, special teams player, kick returner, and punt returner.  During his pro career Criter returned one punt and thirteen kickoffs.  During the 1973 season he recorded a safety.  The Broncos' special teams unit was referred to as Criter's Critters and Criter was considered an "animal" on the coverage team. 

Criter was born to Irmin and Elvira Criter.

See also
Other American Football League players

External links
Playing statistics

1947 births
Living people
American football linebackers
Denver Broncos (AFL) players
Sportspeople from Fond du Lac, Wisconsin
Players of American football from Wisconsin
Wisconsin Badgers football players